The 18th National Film Awards were held in Chennai, India in November 1971 by the Indian Ministry of Information and Broadcasting for Indian films released in 1970. The awards were presented by then President of India, V. V. Giri.

Juries 

The award winners were chosen by four juries, one each for the Bombay, Calcutta and Madras regions and a central jury for all India. For the 18th National Film Awards the central jury was headed by Justice G. D. Khosla.

 Jury Members: Central
 G. D. Khosla (Chair)Shiela VatsTeji BachchanV. K. Narayana MenonAshis BurmanAli Sardar JafriAmmu SwaminathanDin DayalNasir HussainU. Visweswar RaoSubodh Mitra
 Regional Jury: Bombay
 Vijay Tendulkar (Chair)Firoze RangoonwallaBikram SinghK. K. HebbarIrene HerediaIsmat ChughtaiL. G. JogGopinath TalwalkarDevendra GoelShatrujit PaulBhappi Sonie
 Regional Jury: Calcutta
 Amala Shankar (Chair)Amina KarAnant MahapatraA. K. PramanickTarun RoyPankaj MullickRajendra Nath BaruaShibatosh MukerjeeNarayan ChakrabortyDilip SarkarNirmal Chowdhury
 Regional Jury: Madras
 C. R. Pattabhiraman (Chair)K. Venkataswamy NaiduP. P. NaiduMallikarjuna RaoShakuntala HegdeD. RamanaiduVijayalakshmiV. C. SubburamanKambisseri KarunakaranC. N. RamanujamT. S. MuthuswamyK. Kottarakkara

Awards 

Awards were given to feature films and non-feature films.

The top national award in each category was the President's Gold Medal and, at the regional level, the President's Silver Medal.

Lifetime Achievement Award

Feature films 

The Kannada film Samskara won the President's Gold Medal for the All India Best Feature Film. Three award each went to the Hindi films, Dastak and Mera Naam Joker, and to the Bengali film Pratidwandi.

All India Award 

Award recipients:

Regional Award 

The awards were given to the best films made in the regional languages of India. For feature films in Assamese, English, Gujarati, Kashmiri, Oriya and Punjabi language, the resident's Silver Medal for Best Feature Film was not given. The producer and director of the film were awarded with 5,000 and a Silver medal, respectively.

Non-Feature films 

The award recipients were:

Short films

Awards not given 

The following awards not given:

 Best Story Writer
 Best Film on Family Welfare
 Best Children's Film
 Lyric Writer of the Best Film Song on National Integration
 Best Information Film (Documentary)
 Best Educational / Instructional Film
 Best Promotional Film
 Best Experimental Film
 Best Animation Film
 President's Silver Medal for Best Feature Film in Assamese
 President's Silver Medal for Best Feature Film in English
 President's Silver Medal for Best Feature Film in Oriya
 President's Silver Medal for Best Feature Film in Punjabi

References

External links 
 National Film Awards Archives
 Official Page for Directorate of Film Festivals, India

National Film Awards (India) ceremonies
1970 in Indian cinema